Evan Conway (born ) is an American soccer player who plays as a forward for San Diego Loyal in the USL Championship.

Career

Union Omaha
Following a successful open trial, Conway signed with USL League One side Union Omaha ahead of their inaugural season.

San Diego Loyal
On , Conway moved to USL Championship side San Diego Loyal.

References

1997 births
American soccer players
Association football forwards
Living people
Milwaukee Panthers men's soccer players
People from Whitefish Bay, Wisconsin
San Diego Loyal SC players
Soccer players from Wisconsin
Sportspeople from the Milwaukee metropolitan area
Union Omaha players
USL Championship players
USL League One players
USL League Two players
Ventura County Fusion players